Chemical Institute of Sarrià (IQS) is an educational institution that manages two schools of the Ramon Llull University: IQS School of Engineering and IQS School of Management. Both schools offer masters and doctorate programs.

History
Eduardo Vitoria founded Chemical Laboratory of the Ebro at Roquetas, Tarragona, in August 1905. In 1916 he moved it next to St. Ignatius College in Sarrià, where it acquired the name Chemical Institute of Sarrià. In 1965 the Ministry of Education recognized it as a State Higher Technical Education Center. In 1984 it ceased to be a legally dependent centre of the Society of Jesus and became a foundation governed by a board of trustees. On 1 March 1990 it joined with other institutions in becoming Ramon Llull University, the first private university in Catalonia as approved by the Parliament of Catalonia on 10 May 1991, then called the IQS School of Engineering and IQS School of Management (formerly School of Economics ADE).

In 2005, IQS received the Gold Medal of the city of Barcelona and the Cruz de Sant Jordi distinction of the Government of Catalonia, in recognition of their teaching and research. In 2010 construction began on the new IQS School of Management building, which was officially opened by the then Prince of Asturias and Girona on 12 December 2012. In 2013 IQS School of Engineering began offering a degree in biotechnology.

IQS School of Engineering
IQS School of Engineering offers studies in chemistry, chemical engineering, industrial engineering, biotechnology, bioengineering and pharmacy.

See also
 List of Jesuit sites

References  

Jesuit universities and colleges
University Ramon Llull
Organizations established in 1905
1905 establishments in Spain